Following is a list of senators of Côtes-d'Armor, people who have represented the department of Côtes-d'Armor in the Senate of France.
The department was  formerly named Côtes-du-Nord, and became Côtes-d'Armor on 27 February 1990,

Third Republic

Senators for Côtes-du-Nord under the French Third Republic were:

 Jean-Marie Allenou (1876–1880)
 Jules de Monjaret de Kerjegu (1876–1880)
 Henri de Champagny (1876–1885)
 Henri de Treveneuc (1876–1893)
 Silvain Duval (1880–1883)
 Henri de Carné (1880–1912)
 Auguste Le Provost de Launay (1885–1886)
 Tristan de L'Angle Beaumanoir (1885–1895)
 Charles Huon de Penanster (1886–1901)
 Auguste Ollivier (1889–1912)
 Charles Haugoumar des Portes (1893–1911)
 Louis Le Provost de Launay (1896–1912)
 Robert de Treveneuc (1921–1931)
 Guillaume Limon (1912–1920)
 Hervé de Keranflec'h (1912–1921)
 Frédéric de Kerouartz (1912–1921)
 Louis Larère (1912–1921)
 Paul Le Troadec (1920–1930)
 Charles Baudet (1921–1930)
 Henri Servain (1921–1931)
 Gustave de Kerguezec (1921–1939)
 Eugène Mando (1921–1939)
 Yves Le Trocquer (1930–1938)
 Pierre Even (1930–1941)
 Charles Meunier-Surcouf (1931–1939)
 Pierre Betfert (1938–1945)
 Edgar de Kergariou (1939–1941)
 Yves Bouguen (1939–1945)
 Pierre Michel (1939–1945)

Fourth Republic

Senators for Côtes-du-Nord under the French Fourth Republic were:

 Yves Henry (1946–1948)
 Auguste Le Coënt (1946–1948)
 Ferdinand Siabas (1948–1959)
 Henri Cordier (1948–1959)
 André Cornu (1948–1959)
 Yves Jézequel (1948–1959)

Fifth Republic 
Senators for Côtes-du-Nord and then Côtes-d'Armor under the French Fifth Republic:

 André Cornu (1959–1971)
 Jean de Bagneux (1959–1980)
 Yves Le Cozannet (1980–1989)
 Bernard Lemarié (1959–1989)
 Pierre Marzin (1971–1980)
 René Régnault (1980–1998)
 Félix Leyzour (1989–1997)
 Claude Saunier (1989–2008)
 Jean Dérian (1997–1998)
 Pierre-Yvon Trémel (1998–2006)
 Gérard Le Cam (1998–2014)
 Claude Saunier (1989–2008)
 Charles Josselin (2006–2008)
 Jacqueline Chevé (2008–2010)
 Yannick Botrel (from 2008)
 Ronan Kerdraon (2010–2014)
 Christine Prunaud (from 2014)
 Michel Vaspart (from 2014)

References

Sources

 
Lists of members of the Senate (France) by department